Dom Henrique de Bragança, Duke of Coimbra (6 November 1949 – 14 February 2017) was , as the youngest son of Duarte Nuno, Duke of Braganza, Head of the Portuguese Royal Family. His brother, Duarte Pio, Duke of Braganza, is the current head of the royal family.

Life 
Henrique Nuno João Miguel Gabriel Rafael was born on 6 November 1949, in Bern, Switzerland, to Duarte Nuno, Duke of Braganza, the pretender to the defunct throne of Portugal, and Maria Francisca of Orléans-Braganza. His full name ended with Miguel Gabriel Rafael, a naming tradition of the House of Braganza that honors the three archangels in the Catholic Church. 

In 1950, the Portuguese Laws of Banishment were repealed and Henrique's family was permitted to return to Portugal, which he did along with his parents and elder brothers in 1952.

Death 
D. Henrique died on 14 February 2017 aged 67 in Ferragudo, Portugal.

Henrique was fifth in the line of succession to the former Portuguese throne at the time of his death.

Ancestry

References

1949 births
2017 deaths
104
House of Braganza